Terellia matrix is a species of tephritid or fruit flies in the genus Terellia of the family Tephritidae.

Distribution
Tajikistan.

References

Tephritinae
Insects described in 1988
Diptera of Asia